Danish national road 40, is a Danish national road in Vendsyssel in North Jutland between Skagen and Frederikshavn. The length of the road is 45 km (25 mi).

Names of the road

Roads in Denmark